The Municipality of Šoštanj is a municipality in northern Slovenia. The seat of the municipality is the town of Šoštanj. The municipality was established on 3 October 1994, prior to which it belonged to the larger Municipality of Velenje. The municipal holiday is celebrated on 30 October.

Settlements
In addition to the namesake city, the municipality also includes the following settlements:

 Bele Vode
 Družmirje
 Florjan
 Gaberke
 Lokovica
 Ravne
 Šentvid pri Zavodnju
 Skorno pri Šoštanju
 Topolšica
 Zavodnje

References

External links
 
 Municipality of Šoštanj at Geopedia
 Portal Šoštanj.info
 Šoštanj municipal site

 
Sostanj
1994 establishments in Slovenia